The December 2021 New Year's Smash was the second New Year's Smash professional wrestling television special produced by All Elite Wrestling (AEW). It took place on December 29, 2021, at Daily's Place in Jacksonville, Florida. The two-part event was broadcast on TNT as special episodes of AEW's weekly television programs, Wednesday Night Dynamite and Friday Night Rampage. Dynamite aired live while Rampage aired on tape delay on December 31. It was the second New Year's Smash event to be held in 2021, after the first took place in January. The Dynamite broadcast was the show's final episode on TNT as Dynamite moved to TNT's sister channel TBS on January 5, 2022.

In the main event of the Dynamite broadcast, the reunited team of Adam Cole and reDRagon (Bobby Fish and Kyle O'Reilly) defeated Best Friends (Chuck Taylor, Trent? Beretta, and Orange Cassidy), while in the main event of the Rampage broadcast, Cody Rhodes defeated Ethan Page to retain the AEW TNT Championship. The Dynamite broadcast also saw the AEW debut of Mercedes Martinez, who cost Thunder Rosa her semifinals match against Jade Cargill in the AEW TBS Championship tournament. Martinez last appeared in AEW as a free agent at the All Out pay-per-view and an episode of Dark in late 2019.

Production

Background
In January 2021, All Elite Wrestling (AEW) held a two-part television special of Wednesday Night Dynamite called New Year's Smash. On November 8, 2021, AEW President Tony Khan confirmed that New Year's Smash would return live on December 29 for Dynamite and an episode of Friday Night Rampage that would air on tape delay on New Year's Eve. The December 29 episode marked the final episode of Dynamite on TNT; the show moved to TBS on January 5, 2022, while Rampage remained on TNT. This was part of AEW's end-of-year Christmas party. The event returned AEW to its home venue of Daily's Place in Jacksonville, Florida.

Storylines
New Year's Smash featured professional wrestling matches that involved different wrestlers from pre-existing scripted feuds and storylines. Wrestlers portrayed heroes, villains, or less distinguishable characters in scripted events that built tension and culminated in a wrestling match or series of matches. Storylines were produced on AEW's weekly television programs, Dynamite and Rampage, the supplementary online streaming shows, Dark and Elevation, and The Young Bucks' YouTube series Being The Elite.

Results

References

External links

2020s American television specials
2021 American television episodes
2021 in professional wrestling
2021 in professional wrestling in Florida
All Elite Wrestling shows
Events in Florida
December 2021 events in the United States
Events in Jacksonville, Florida
Professional wrestling in Jacksonville, Florida
Holidays themed professional wrestling events